Interferon alfacon-1 is a recombinant synthetic type I interferon used for the treatment of hairy cell leukemia, malignant melanoma and AIDS-related Kaposi's sarcoma.

References 

Immunostimulants
Antiviral drugs